Cyril Holland (born Cyril Wilde, 5 June 1885 – 9 May 1915) was the older of the two sons of Oscar Wilde and Constance Lloyd and brother to Vyvyan Holland.

Life
According to his brother Vyvyan Holland's accounts in his autobiography, Son of Oscar Wilde (1954), Oscar was a devoted and loving father to his two sons. Their childhood was a relatively happy one. However, after Wilde's very public trials, conviction in 1895, and imprisonment for gross indecency, their mother Constance chose to take the family out of the spotlight.

She took the surname Holland for both the boys and herself in order to protect them from public scrutiny. She moved with the boys to Switzerland and enrolled them at Neuenheim College, an English-speaking boarding school in Heidelberg, Germany. Oscar Wilde died in 1900; neither of his sons saw him again after he went to prison. When he was released, he went to France and never lived in England or Ireland again.

From 1899 to 1903 Cyril attended Radley College, a private school then in Berkshire.  After leaving school, he became a gentleman cadet at the Royal Military Academy, Woolwich.

Holland was commissioned as a 2nd lieutenant, Royal Field Artillery, on 20 December 1905. He was promoted to lieutenant on 20 December 1908 and served in the United Kingdom for nearly three years. He was posted to India, where he served from September 1911 until 1914 with No. 9 Ammunition Column, RFA at Secunderabad. He was promoted to captain on 30 October 1914.

Death
When the First World War broke out, Captain Holland was posted to British forces on the Continent. He took part in the battle for Neuve-Chapelle, where he was killed in France by a German sniper on 9 May 1915, during the Battle of Festubert. His grave is maintained by the War Graves Commission in St Vaast Post Military Cemetery, Richebourg-l'Avoué, France.

References

External links
 Wilde children

1885 births
1915 deaths
British Army personnel of World War I
British military personnel killed in World War I
English people of Irish descent
Oscar Wilde
Place of birth missing
People educated at Radley College
Royal Field Artillery officers
Graduates of the Royal Military Academy, Woolwich
Deaths by firearm in France